Sudbrook is a hamlet in the South Kesteven district of Lincolnshire, England. It forms part of Ancaster civil parish. Ancaster railway station on the Nottingham–Skegness line is a mile-and-a-half (2 km) from Sudbrook.

External links

South Kesteven District
Hamlets in Lincolnshire